Omonoia  may refer to:

Omonoia Square, one of Athens' main squares
Omonoia Station, the subway station located on the square
Omonoia, Athens, the neighborhood around it
Omonoia (organization), a political and cultural organization of the Greeks living in Albania
AC Omonia, a Cypriot football/soccer team
Omonoia, Limassol, a quarter of Limassol, Cyprus